Plesiocystiscus josephinae is a species of minute sea snail, a marine gastropod mollusk in the family Cystiscidae.

Distribution
This species is endemic to São Tomé and Príncipe.

References

Cystiscidae
Endemic fauna of São Tomé and Príncipe
Invertebrates of São Tomé and Príncipe
Gastropods described in 1992
Taxonomy articles created by Polbot
Taxobox binomials not recognized by IUCN